Peter Bell is a 2002 Dutch family film, based on the Pietje Bell books of Chris van Abkoude, and directed by Maria Peters.

The film received a Golden Film (75,000 visitors) and a Platinum Film (200,000 visitors) in 2002.

References

External links
Official website 

2002 films
Dutch comedy films
Dutch children's films
2000s Dutch-language films
Films based on Dutch novels
Films set in the Netherlands
Films shot in Cologne
2000s children's comedy films
2002 comedy films